Joseph Blewett (25 September 1925 – 21 March 2013) was a South African cricketer. He played first-class cricket for North Eastern Transvaal and Transvaal between 1950 and 1960.

References

External links
 

1925 births
2013 deaths
South African cricketers
Northerns cricketers
Gauteng cricketers
Cricketers from Johannesburg